Austin Powers is a series of American spy action comedy films: Austin Powers: International Man of Mystery (1997), Austin Powers: The Spy Who Shagged Me (1999) and Austin Powers in Goldmember (2002). The films were produced and written by Mike Myers, who also starred as the title character and Dr. Evil. They were directed by Jay Roach and distributed by New Line Cinema.

The franchise parodies numerous films and characters, including the James Bond series and Jason King, and incorporates myriad other elements of popular culture as it follows a British spy's quest to bring his nemesis down. The character of Powers represents an archetype of 1960s Swinging London, with his advocacy of free love, his use of obscure impressions and his clothing style.

The films poke fun at the outrageous plots, rampant sexual innuendo, and one-dimensional stock characters associated with 1960s spy films.

The general theme of the films is that the arch villain Dr. Evil plots to extort large sums of money from governments or international bodies but is constantly thwarted by Powers, and (to a degree) his own inexperience with life and culture in the 1990s.

In Austin Powers: International Man of Mystery, Austin and Dr. Evil are awakened after being placed in cryonic suspension for thirty years. Continuing to incorporate cultural elements of the 1960s and 1970s, Austin Powers: The Spy Who Shagged Me and Austin Powers in Goldmember feature time travel as a plot device and deliberately overlook inconsistencies. A proposed fourth film, Austin Powers 4, has reportedly been in development since 2005, but has since been stalled.

Development
Myers himself has stated in interviews that the idea for Austin Powers came to him one night while driving home from ice hockey practice. Hearing the song "The Look of Love" by Burt Bacharach on his car radio, he wondered "Where have all the swingers gone?" and conceived the character who would become Austin Powers.

In an interview in November 2018 with Access Hollywood, Myers stated, "After my dad died in 1991, I was taking stock of his influence on me as a person and his influence on me with comedy in general. So Austin Powers was a tribute to my father, who [introduced me to] James Bond, Peter Sellers, The Beatles, The Goodies, Peter Cook and Dudley Moore."

The Austin Powers character first appeared in the band Ming Tea, with Myers as Powers, Susanna Hoffs as Jillian Shagwell, and Matthew Sweet as Sid Belvedere. Myers' wife Robin Ruzan said Myers should write a movie based on Powers.

The first phrase he thought the character might say was "Do I make you horny?", which later did indeed become a catchphrase for the character. He has also disclosed that the character also draws on his recollections of former Radio Caroline DJ Simon Dee, who hosted the first real television chat show in the United Kingdom in 1967, which ended with his driving off in a sports car with a young blonde in the passenger seat. An important inspiration for the series is British super spy James Bond. Myers said of Bond, "I can't even tell you how huge it was in our house ... That's really why I wanted to do Austin Powers. Austin Powers is out of pure love for James Bond."

Though Myers is Canadian by birth, his parents are natives of Liverpool, England, and Myers holds dual nationality. Although the films parody the plots and characters of 1960s spy movies and the Swinging London fashion scene of the era, the humour is influenced by Myers's British heritage, particularly the Carry On films and the comedic works of Benny Hill and Peter Sellers, the latter of whom Myers is a self confessed fan (his favorite films being the Bond spoof Casino Royale and The Party).

Powers' bad teeth were created by Los Angeles dental technician Gary Archer. Myers came to Archer and told him, "I want bad British 1960s teeth", based on a widely-held stereotype. Archer took pictures of expat patrons at an English pub that he frequented in the San Fernando Valley, made sketches, and showed Myers the design. Myers told him that he had "nailed it".

Influences from Sellers' films are apparent throughout the series; the character of Austin Powers reflects the inspiration of Sellers' portrayal of the character Robert Danvers in the 1970 film There's a Girl in My Soup. Myers states Powers' dandyish appearance was also inspired by that of Jason King – the adventurous character (played by Peter Wyngarde) from the ITV Spy fi series Department S who was featured in the eponymous spin off series. Myers was also influenced by the comedy troupe Monty Python, with film critic Robbie Collin writing "the Austin Powers series chugs along on Pythonisms."

Other obviously apparent influences are the BBC's Adam Adamant Lives! television series, whose protagonist was a Victorian era spy, who was frozen in 1902, and then revived in the year 1966; The 1965 James Bond parody Dr. Goldfoot and the Bikini Machine, in which a mad scientist builds a small army of attractive female robots; the Matt Helm series of film starring Dean Martin; The Beatles films, The Monkees television series, and the "cocktail party" skits from Rowan and Martin's Laugh-In. Powers was also influenced by the secret agent Harry Palmer (played by Michael Caine in three films, beginning with the 1965 film The Ipcress File), especially Caine's thick horn-rimmed glasses. Caine himself starred in Austin Powers in Goldmember (2002), with his portrayal of Nigel Powers, father of Austin Powers, spoofing Harry Palmer.

Cast

Crew

Cars

The series featured two cars number plates "SWINGER" and "SWINGER2" and collectively dubbed the "Shaguars" that were portrayed by a 1961 Jaguar E-Type and a 2001 Jaguar XK8 convertible, with a Union Jack paint scheme. The Ministry of Defence creates two cars to transport Powers through time: a psychedelic rainbow painted 1999 Volkswagen "New Beetle" convertible in the second film, and a purple 1975 Cadillac Eldorado Fleetwood "pimpmobile" (number plate "SWNGR 3") in the third.

In the second film, Felicity Shagwell drives a 1965 Chevrolet Corvette with an American flag paint scheme. In the third Nigel Powers has a 2001 Mini Cooper – able to travel underwater, and which bears the number plate "GR8 SHAG".

Reception

Box office performance

Critical response

Media

Films

The series consists of three films:
 Austin Powers: International Man of Mystery released on May 2, 1997
 Austin Powers: The Spy Who Shagged Me released on June 11, 1999
 Austin Powers in Goldmember released on July 26, 2002

Games

Video games and pinball
 Austin Powers Operation: Trivia (PC, Macintosh, 1999)
 Austin Powers: Oh, Behave! (Game Boy Color, 2000)
 Austin Powers: Welcome to My Underground Lair! (Game Boy Color, 2000)
 Austin Powers (pinball) (Stern Pinball, 2001)
 Austin Powers Pinball (PlayStation and PC, 2002)
 Austin Powers: Mojo Rally (Dreamcast, Cancelled)

Other
 Austin Powers, a ticket redemption game by Sega Pinball (1997)
 Austin Powers Collectible Card Game by Decipher Inc (1999)
 Austin Powers, a pinball machine by Stern Pinball (2001)

Cancelled animated series
HBO purchased the rights to produce an animated series based on the Austin Powers films in May 1999. Despite announcing plans for a thirteen episode season, HBO ultimately shelved the project.

Possible fourth film
In October 2005, in an interview with Entertainment Weekly, Mike Myers discussed the possibility of studio sources moving forward with a fourth film: "There is hope! We're all circling and talking to each other. I miss doing the characters."

In May 2007, in an interview with IGN, "So no more Austin Powers?" was asked, and Myers replied, "No, no, there is a fully conceived idea for a fourth and I can just say that it's from Dr. Evil's point of view. So if you balanced how much of it was Austin with Dr. Evil, it's more about Dr. Evil than Austin". Also, in the audio commentary from the DVD release of Austin Powers in Goldmember, Myers revealed that in the fourth film, Fat Bastard would return and regain the weight that he lost in Goldmember.

In May 2007, at the Shrek the Third premiere, Mike Myers announced that a fourth Austin Powers film was planned, but that it would focus more on Dr. Evil rather than Austin. He also said that he would start work on it after he started work on The Love Guru, which became a box office bomb. In February 2008, it was announced that Jay Roach would return as director. In April 2008, it was reported that Gisele Bündchen had been offered a role in the film.

However, Seth Green, who played Scott Evil, stated that there was no script at the moment and that Austin Powers 4 would be made if a script is written and approved. In June 2008, in an interview, when asked about another Austin Powers film, Myers stated, "I have an idea, and again it's one of those things that will emerge or it won't." In July 2008, Mike Myers stated that he had begun writing Austin Powers 4, and that the plot is "really about Dr. Evil and his son."

In March 2010, Jay Roach indicated to MTV that Myers is working on ideas for a fourth film. In August 2011, Mike Myers revealed he would return, and had begun writing a script for a fourth installment. In September 2013, when asked about the future of Austin Powers, Myers answered "I'm still figuring that out." In September 2015, Verne Troyer expressed his desire to return as Mini-Me if he was asked to do so.

In May 2016, Roach was asked about the fourth Austin Powers film during an interview with Larry King, and he stated the ideas for the fourth film that he and Myers have are good and interesting. In August 2016, in a telephone interview, Mike Myers stated "Everything is being negotiated and worked out and all that stuff" regarding the fourth installment of the Austin Powers film series.

In April 2017, as the 20th anniversary approached for Austin Powers: International Man of Mystery, Mike Myers claimed, "I would love to do another, but you just have to see". Two days later, Roach stated that a fourth film would only occur if Myers creates a good story for it. In May 2017, Troyer stated that Mini-Me would reveal that he can speak in the fourth movie. On April 5, 2018, Myers reprised his role as Dr. Evil on a segment of The Tonight Show Starring Jimmy Fallon complaining about having been dismissed from a Cabinet post in the Trump administration, raising speculation that a fourth film was in development. Following the death of Verne Troyer on April 21, 2018, questions have been raised about the potential for a fourth film without the character of Mini-Me, or with the part recast. Roach claimed in an interview that a fourth Austin Powers film may not be possible without Troyer.

In May 2018, Myers reiterated his interest in making a fourth Austin Powers, stating that it would be fun, also hinting that some tribute to Troyer might be included. In November 2018, Myers stated that the project's future is "looking good" with the script already written and that Austin Powers and Dr. Evil will return soon, citing his parenthood as the reason for how long the production has lasted and that Roach will most likely reprise his directorial duties.

In January 2020, Jay Roach again indicated that he was interested in doing a fourth film. In February 2022, Myers told The Today Show he "would love to do" a fourth Austin Powers movie but could "neither confirm nor deny" whether it would be made.

In October 2022, Mike Myers stated on the Tonight Show that he would "love" to make another Austin Powers film, again citing parenting as the main reason as to why the film has not yet been made.

Notes

References

External links

 
 
 
  (Rumoured for many years but never gone into production.)

 
Film series introduced in 1997
Action film series
American film series
Comedy film series
Parody films based on James Bond films